The Kentucky Jockey Club Stakes is an American Thoroughbred horse race run annually during the last week of November at Churchill Downs in Louisville, Kentucky.  A Grade II event, the race is open to two-year-olds willing to race one and one-sixteenth miles on the dirt, and is a Road to the Kentucky Derby race, offering points to the top four horses towards being one of the 18 horses eligible for the race by points in North American races (there are spots available to European and Asian horses which participate in races in their respective continents, but if they decline, those spots go to the next highest in points from the North American events).

Inaugurated in 1920, the Kentucky Jockey Club Stakes was contested at a distance of one mile from its inception through 1979. The race was transferred to the Latonia Race Track in Covington, Kentucky in 1931 but returned to Churchill Downs in 1934.

There was no race run between 1939 and 1945 because of World War II.

Historical notes

Five horses have won the Kentucky Jockey Club Stakes and then returned the next spring to win the Kentucky Derby.  The most recent Derby winner was Super Saver (2010).  Prior winners were Cannonade (1974), Twenty Grand (1931), Clyde Van Dusen (1929) and Reigh Count (1928).

In 1930, Twenty Grand won the Kentucky Jockey Club Stakes in a track record time of 1:36 flat which at the time was the fastest mile ever run by a two-year-old in the United States.

In 1933, Mata Hari became the first filly to win the Kentucky Jockey Club Stakes.

Records
Speed record: (at current distance of  miles)
 1:42.83 – Super Saver (2009)
Most wins by a jockey

 4 – Calvin H. Borel (2000, 2008, 2009, 2014)

Most wins by a trainer

 3 – D. Wayne Lukas (1989, 1991, 1997)

Most wins by an owner

 4 – John C. Oxley (1994, 2008, 2012, 2015)

Winners

Earlier winners

1988 – Tricky Creek
1987 – Notebook †
1986 – Mt. Pleasant
1985 – Mustin Lake
1984 – Fuzzy
1983 – Biloxi Indian
1982 – Highland Park
1981 – El Baba
1980 – Television Studio
1979 – King Neptune
1978 – Lot O Gold
1977 – Going Investor
1976 – Run Dusty Run
1975 – Play Boy
1974 – Circle Home
1973 – Cannonade
1972 – Puntilla
1971 – Windjammer
1970 – Line City
1969 – Evasive Action
1968 – Traffic Mark
1967 – Mr. Brogann
1966 – Lightning Orphan
1965 – War Censor
1964 – Umbrella Fella
1963 – Journalist
1962 – Sky Gem
1961 – Su Ka wa
1960 – Crimson Fury
1959 – Oil Wick
1958 – Winsome Winner
1957 – Hill Country
1956 – Federal Hill
1955 – Royal Sting
1954 – Prince Noor
1953 – Hasty Road
1952 – Straight Face
1951 – Sub Fleet
1950 – Pur Sang
1949 – Roman Bath
1948 – John's Joy
1947 – Bold Gallant
1946 – Double Jay  
1939–1945 : no race 
1938 – T M Dorsett
1937 – Mountain Ridge
1936 – Reaping Reward
1935 – Grand Slam
1934 – Nellie Flag
1933 – Mata Hari
1932 – The Darb
1931 – Kakapo
1930 – Twenty Grand
1929 – Desert Light
1928 – Clyde Van Dusen
1927 – Reigh Count
1926 – Valorous
1925 – Canter
1924 – Master Charlie
1923 – Wise Counsellor
1922 – Enchantment
1921 – Startle
1920 – Tryster

 † In 1987, Buoy won the race but was disqualified for interference and set back to second.

See also
Road to the Kentucky Derby

References

The 2008 Kentucky Jockey Club Stakes at Bloodhorse.com

Churchill Downs horse races
Flat horse races for two-year-olds
Graded stakes races in the United States
Recurring sporting events established in 1920
1920 establishments in Kentucky